Meotipa vesiculosa is a species of species of cobweb spider in the family Theridiidae found in the Americas, Papua New Guinea, China, Korea, Japan, and PacificIslands. It was described by Eugène Simon in 1895.

Meotipa vesiculosa was formerly a member of the genus Chrysso.

References

Endemic fauna of the Philippines
Theridiidae
Spiders described in 1895